Henry Bedford (15 October 1899 – 24 June 1976) was an English professional footballer who played as a forward. He scored 308 league goals in 488 league appearances.

Club career
Harry Bedford began his playing career playing with hometown club Bonds Main FC and then joined his older brother Walter, at Grassmoor Ivanhoe FC in the Chesterfield League. It was here both brothers were invited for trials with Nottingham Forest FC in 1916. During the war years Harry made two appearances for Forest and also played in a match for Huddersfield Town. Second division Forest signed Harry as a professional after the war in August 1919. He made 5 appearances and scored 3 goals in his first season and after scoring 5 in 13 matches of the 1920-21 season, he left for Blackpool on the 8 March 1921, for a fee of £1,200.

He made his debut for the Tangerines in a 1–0 league defeat at South Shields on 12 March 1921 and scored his first goal for the club in the return match at Bloomfield Road seven days later. In 1921–22, his first full season, he managed 11 goals and scored in their one FA Cup match. The following two years saw him finish the season as not only Blackpool’s top scorer but also the football leagues. In the 1922–23 season he played in all 42 league games and scored 32 goals, then one better in 1923–24, the country's top scorer with 33 goals, a feat which only Jimmy Hampson equalled. In 1924–25, Bedford's goals helped Blackpool reach the fourth round of the FA Cup for the first time and he scored 24 goals in 40 league games. Bedford started the 1925–26 season scoring 6 goals in 7 matches, before he was transferred to Derby County for £3,900 on 25 September 1925. Title chasing Derby required a centre forward after Stan Fazackerley was abruptly forced to retire through injury. Bedford had scored 112 goals in 172 league games and scored 6 goals in 11 FA Cup appearances.

His Rams debut was at the City Ground helping his new side beat his old side 2-1. His home debut came against Swansea, scoring a hat-trick in a 5-0 victory. He hit two more hat-tricks against Stoke City and Sheffield Wednesday as he finished top scorer with 27 goals for the Rams, who won promotion finishing as runners up to Sheffield Wednesday. His form continued in the first division, ending the next four seasons as the club's top scorer. He made 203 league appearances and scored 142 goals and in his 15 FA Cup matches he scored 10 goals.

In December 1930, with the prolific Jack Bowers the preferred centre forward, he was transferred to Newcastle United, the 31-year-old costing £4,000 to replace the outgoing Hughie Gallacher on Tyneside. In February he scored for the Magpies in their 5-1 win at the Baseball Ground. He ended the season with 12 goals in 23 league games. He had scored 5 goals in 7 matches the next season before leaving for rivals Sunderland in January 1932, making 7 appearances, scoring twice. He was back in the second division for the start of the 1932-33 season, after signing for Bradford Park Avenue where he scored 15 goals in 33 matches. The following season he was playing in the Third Division North, with Chesterfield. He then became player-manager of non-League Heanor Town. 

He died in Derby on 24 June 1976.

International career
Bedford was capped twice for England. He made his debut in a friendly match against Sweden on 21 May 1923, included in England's end of season tour of Scandinavia. England won 4–2. His only other England cap came in a British Home Championship match against Ireland on 22 October 1924, at Goodison Park, Liverpool. He scored England's second goal in a 3–1 victory.

Managerial career
In October 1937 he joined the backroom staff at Newcastle United as a masseur and later took the same position at Derby County. He moved into management in 1954 with Belper Town before making a return to Heanor Town, a position he held until he resigned in 1955.

Blackpool F.C. Hall of Fame
Bedford was inducted into the Hall of Fame at Bloomfield Road, when it was officially opened by former Blackpool player Jimmy Armfield in April 2006. Organised by the Blackpool Supporters Association, Blackpool fans around the world voted on their all-time heroes. Five players from each decade are inducted; Bedford is in the pre-1950s.

Career statistics

Club statistics

International statistics

International goals
Scores and results list England's goal tally first. Score after each Bedford goal is shown in bold with asterisk.

References

Further reading

External links
Profile on Bedford at Blackpool F.C.'s official website
England profile at the FA.com
Profile at EnglandFC.com
Pool Legends – Blackpool F.C.'s official website
Bedford in the Blackpool Supporters Association Hall of Fame

1899 births
1976 deaths
Footballers from Chesterfield
English footballers
England international footballers
Nottingham Forest F.C. players
Blackpool F.C. players
Derby County F.C. players
Newcastle United F.C. players
Sunderland A.F.C. players
Bradford (Park Avenue) A.F.C. players
Chesterfield F.C. players
English football managers
Heanor Town F.C. managers
English Football League players
English Football League representative players
Association football forwards
People from Calow
Footballers from Derbyshire